Radical 97 or radical melon  meaning "melon" is one of the 23 Kangxi radicals (214 radicals in total) composed of 5 strokes (6 strokes in Japanese).

In the Kangxi Dictionary, there are 55 characters (out of 49,030) to be found under this radical.

 is also the 113th indexing component in the Table of Indexing Chinese Character Components predominantly adopted by Simplified Chinese dictionaries published in mainland China.

Evolution

Derived characters

Variant forms
Traditionally, the character consists of five strokes. In Japanese kanji simplification, however, the third stroke (i.e. a vertical-horizontal turning stroke) was broken into two strokes, and  became a six-stroke radical character. This change also applies to hyōgai kanji.

Literature

External links

Unihan Database - U+74DC

097
113